Princess Salha bint Asem (born 14 June 1987 in Amman) is the daughter of Prince Asem bin Al Nayef and Princess Sana Asem.

Siblings

Siblings 

 Prince Nayef ben Asem (born 22 January 1998)
 Princess Nejla bint Asem (born 9 May 1988)

Half-Siblings 

 Princess Yasmeen bint Asem (born 30 June 1975)
 Princess Sara bint Asem (born 12 August 1978)
 Princess Nour bint Asem (born 6 October 1982)

Education 
 Amman Baccalaureate School in Jordan
 Princess Haya Education Centre in Amman, Jordan
 Culver Academic School in Indiana, United States
 St Clare's International School, Oxford in England (summer school) 
 University of Edinburgh, Scotland

Marriage
On 4 April 2011, Princess Salha married the Jordanian Mohammad Hashim Haj-Hassan at her father's house. The couple have a girl named Aisha (born 27 May 2013) and two boys named Hashim (born 1 December 2015) and Abdullah (born 3 September 2018).

References 

1987 births
House of Hashim
People from Amman
Living people
Jordanian princesses
People educated at St. Clare's, Oxford
People educated at Amman Baccalaureate School
Alumni of the University of Edinburgh